Eileen Ward Petersen (born 15 July 1937) is a Danish former swimmer. She competed in the women's 200 metre breaststroke at the 1952 Summer Olympics.

References

1937 births
Living people
Danish female swimmers
Olympic swimmers of Denmark
Swimmers at the 1952 Summer Olympics
Swimmers from Copenhagen